Year 1263 (MCCLXIII) was a common year starting on Monday (link will display the full calendar) of the Julian calendar.

Events 
 By place 

 Byzantine Empire 
 Summer – Emperor Michael VIII (Palaiologos) sends a Byzantine expeditionary force (some 3,500 men) led by his half-brother, Constantine Palaiologos, to the Peloponnese in southern Greece. The army is transported to Monemvasia on Genoese ships, while a small Byzantine fleet is sent to harass the Latin island holdings in Euboea and the Cyclades. After arriving at Monemvasia, Constantine lays siege to Lacedaemon (or Sparta), while the Byzantine fleet seizes the southern coast of Laconia. 
 Battle of Prinitza: Constantine Palaiologos marches the Byzantine army up the rivers Eurotas and Alfeios towards the Achaean capital, Andravida. At a narrow pass at Prinitza (near Ancient Olympia) in Elis, the Byzantines are attacked by Achaean forces (some 300 horsemen) under John of Katavas, who inflict a resounding defeat upon them; many Byzantine soldiers are killed. Constantine himself barely escapes with his life, and flees with the remainder of his army to the safety of Mystras.Longnon, Jean (1969). The Frankish States in Greece, 1204–1311, pp. 253–254. In Wolff, Robert Lee; Hazard, Harry W. (eds.). A History of the Crusades, Volume II: The Later Crusades, 1189–1311, pp. 234–275. University of Wisconsin Press. .
 Battle of Settepozzi: A Byzantine-Genoese fleet (some 50 galleys) is routed by the Venetians near Spetses in the Argolic Gulf, who capture four ships and inflict considerable casualties. Later, the Genoese that survive the battle managed to capture Chania on Crete. They receive orders to avoid direct confrontations with the Venetian fleet, but instead are engaged in raiding against the Venetian merchant convoys in the Euripus Strait. 

 Europe 
 July – Scottish–Norwegian War: King Haakon IV (the Old) assembles a fleet (some 120 warships), and sets sail to defend the Hebrides, in an attempt to reassert Norwegian sovereignty over the Western Isles of Scotland. Haakon stops at the Isle of Arran – where in August negotiations are started with the 21-year-old King Alexander III. The talks are prolonged by the Scots until the autumn storms begin.
 October 2 – Battle of Largs: Scottish forces under Alexander Stewart rout a Viking invasion force led by Haakon IV at Largs in North Ayrshire. The battle is inconclusive, on the morning of October 3, the Norwegians return to collect their dead and burn their beached ships. By the end of October, the Viking fleet reaches Orkney, where Haakon becomes ill and dies at the Bishop's Palace, on December 16.
 December – Magnus VI (the Law-mender) succeeds his father Haakon IV (the Old) as king of Norway. The chieftains of the eastern part of Iceland become the last to pledge fealty to Magnus – bringing a more complete end to the Icelandic Commonwealth and the Age of the Sturlungs.
 Mindaugas (Mendog), the only Christian king of Lithuania, is assassinated by his cousin Treniota. The country reverts to paganism and loses its status as a kingdom. Treniota usurps the throne (until 1264).
 King James I (the Conqueror) captures Crevillent from the Moors and becomes a part of the Kingdom of Valencia during the Reconquista.
 Winter – King Alfonso X (the Wise) conquers Niebla from the Moors – terminating any Muslim presence in the western region of Spain.

 England 
 Baronial forces led by Robert de Ferrers and Henry de Montfort lay siege to Worcester. The attackers finally enter the city and are allowed to sack the city, The Jewish community is also targeted by the attackers. Most of them are killed. The Worcester massacre is part of a wider campaign by allies of Simon de Montfort at the start of the Second Barons' War.

 Levant 
 April 4 – Egyptian forces led by Sultan Baibars (or Abu al-Futuh) attack Acre, there is severe fighting outside the walls, in which the seneschal, Geoffrey of Sergines, is badly wounded. Baibars is not yet ready to besiege the city and begins a major campaign to eliminate the Crusader kingdom of Jerusalem, the county of Tripoli and the principality of Antioch.Williams, Hywel (2005). Cassell's Chronology of World History, p. 145. .

 By topic 

 Arts and Culture 
 The Savoy Palace is constructed in London by Peter II, Count of Savoy.

 Education 
 Balliol College, Oxford is founded by the English nobleman John I de Balliol (approximate date).

 Markets 
 Edward (the Lord Edward), son and heir of King Henry III, seizes £10,000, which had been deposited to the trust of the Knights Templar in London, by foreign merchants and English magnates.
 The Bonsignori firm gains the full market of the transfer of fiscal revenue, from the papal estates to Rome.

 Religion 
 July 20–24 – Nahmanides, Spanish chief rabbi, defends the Talmud in an important debate (also called the Disputation of Barcelona) against Pablo Christiani, before James I (the Conqueror).
 The doctrines of Joachim of Fiore, French hermit and theologian, are condemned as heresy by the Catholic Church at a synod in Arles (approximate date).

Births 
 January 22 – Ibn Taymiyyah, Syrian philosopher (d. 1328)
 February 8 – Afonso of Portugal, Portuguese prince (d. 1312)
 March 20 – Yolande of Dreux, queen of Scotland (d. 1330)
 Henry III, German nobleman (House of Gorizia) (d. 1323)
 Ingeborg of Sweden, countess of Holstein-Plön (d. 1292)
 Juliana FitzGerald, Norman-Irish noblewoman (d. 1300)
 Napoleone Orsini, Italian cardinal and diplomat (d. 1342)
 Philip of Flanders, Flemish nobleman and knight (d. 1308)
 Roseline de Villeneuve, French nun and saint (d. 1329)
 Theobald II (or Thiebaut), German nobleman (d. 1312)
 Tolberto III, Italian nobleman and condottiero (d. 1317)
 Zhongfeng Mingben, Chinese Buddhist master (d. 1323)

Deaths 
 January 7 – Agnes of Merania, duchess of Carinthia (b. 1215)
 January 16 – Shinran Shonin, founder of Shin Buddhism (b. 1173)
 March 19 – Hugh of Saint-Cher, French friar and bishop (b. 1200)
 April 20 – John I, German nobleman (House of Schauenburg) 
 November 14 – Alexander Nevsky, Grand Prince of Novgorod
 December 16 – Haakon IV (the Old), king of Norway (b. 1204) 
 December 24 – Hōjō Tokiyori, Japanese nobleman (b. 1227)
 Al-Ashraf Musa, Ayyubid prince (emir) and ruler (b. 1229)
 Boniface, Savoyan nobleman (House of Savoy) (b. 1245)
 Caesarius of Alagno, Italian priest, bishop and counsellor
 Gilbert I de la Hay, Scottish nobleman, knight and regent
 Guy I de la Roche, duke of Athens and Thebes (b. 1205)
 John XIII Aaron bar Ma'dani, Syrian patriarch of Antioch
 Manuel I (Megas Komnenos), emperor of Trebizond
 Martino della Torre, Italian nobleman and condottiero
 Mindaugas (or Mendog), king of Lithuania (b. 1203)
 Senana ferch Caradog, Welsh noblewoman (b. 1198)

References